The organs of Cologne Cathedral are the major source of instrumental music at the cathedral, being played for daily services and accompanying the choir, as well as being used for concerts and recitals. 

The organists of Cologne Cathedral have included Josef Zimmermann, Clemens Ganz and Winfried Bönig. Since their inauguration by Professor Zimmermann in 1960, there has been a series of twelve concerts each year, on Tuesday evenings from June to September.

Organs
The cathedral contains two Klais pipe organs built in 1948 and 1998.

Transept Organ (Klais 1948/1956)

Nave Organ (Klais 1998)

 Couplers: I/II, III/II, III/I, Sub III/III, Sub III/II, Super III/III, Super III/II, Super III/I, I/P, II/P, III/P.

References

Cologne Cathedral
Innenstadt, Cologne
Music in Cologne
Cologne Cathedral